The 2008 IIHF Challenge Cup of Asia took place in Hong Kong, China from 24 April to 26 April. It was the first annual event, and was run by the International Ice Hockey Federation (IIHF). Chinese Taipei won the championship, winning four out of their five games.

Standings

Fixtures
All times local.

References

External links
International Ice Hockey Federation

Iihf Challenge Cup Of Asia, 2008
Challenge Cup Of Asia, 2008
2008
2008
International sports competitions hosted by Hong Kong